is a passenger railway station located in the city of Miyoshi, Tokushima Prefecture, Japan, operated by JR Shikoku.

Lines
Tsukuda Stationis served by the following JR Shikoku lines:

Only local trains from both lines stop at the station.

Layout
The station consists of an island platform serving two tracks. A small building on the side of the access road serves as a waiting room. An overhead footbridge gives access to the island platform which has a weather shelter.

Adjacent stations

History
On 10 January 1950, it was upgraded as Tsukuda Station and passenger services commenced. At this time the station was operated by Japanese National Railways (JNR). With the privatization of JNR on 1 April 1987, control of the station passed to JR Shikoku.

Passenger statistics
In fiscal 2019, the station was used by an average of 38 passengers daily

Surrounding area
Yoshino River
 Japan National Route 192

See also
List of railway stations in Japan

References

External links

 JR Shikoku timetable

Railway stations in Tokushima Prefecture
Railway stations in Japan opened in 1950
Miyoshi, Tokushima